Victoria International Airport  serves Victoria, British Columbia, Canada. The airport is run by the Victoria Airport Authority. YYJ has many nonstop daily flights to Vancouver International Airport (YVR, about 15 minutes), which is a major airport serving many global routes. Additionally, Victoria International has nonstop service to Seattle (SEA), Toronto (YYZ), Montreal (YUL, summer only), Calgary (YYC), Edmonton (YEG), and several smaller cities in British Columbia and Yukon. The airport also has seasonal (late fall to early spring) nonstop service to several Mexican resort destinations. Non-stop service between Victoria and the United States decreased by 50% at the beginning of September 2019 when Delta Airlines permanently ended its three daily flights to Seattle, after which only Alaska Airlines continued to fly the route.

Victoria International Airport is classified as an airport of entry by Nav Canada and is staffed by the Canada Border Services Agency (CBSA). CBSA officers at this airport can handle aircraft with no more than 450 passengers, when unloaded from the aircraft in stages, or 120 normally. YYJ does not have United States customs and border preclearance, however many passengers fly first to Vancouver International Airport (YVR), which does have U.S. preclearance.

In 2018, YYJ served 2,048,627 passengers and had 120,936 aircraft movements, making it Canada's 11th busiest airport in terms of passengers. It was British Columbia's third busiest airport in terms of passengers and aircraft movements.

Like most airports that are run by local authorities in Canada, YYJ charges an airport improvement fee for each outgoing passenger. As of December 2018, it was $15.00 per departing passenger. AIF fees are usually added to fares and collected automatically by most airlines.

History
The airport started in 1939 as a grass strip, and was used as a military training airfield. During the early part of WWII (1940 - 1941), the airfield was used as Royal Air Force Station Patricia Bay, for training personnel for basic flying training, preparatory to returning them to the UK.

The aerodrome was listed with three runways as follows:

The airport is located beside Patricia Bay, which, due to the prevalence of flying boats at the time, proved to be an excellent location. The Department of Transport took over the airport in 1948. It was then called Victoria (Patricia Bay) Airport, and many locals still refer to it as the "Pat Bay Airport". Trans-Canada Airlines (later Air Canada) began regular service in 1943.

The last Royal Canadian Air Force (RCAF) unit left the airport in 1952. In the late 1980s the RCAF returned to the property when 443 Helicopter Squadron began operating CH-124 Sea King ship-borne anti-submarine helicopters from Victoria International Airport. The RCAF refers to 443 Squadron operations at the airport as the Patricia Bay Heliport.

In 1959, the airport was renamed the "Victoria International Airport".

In 1997, as part of a broad scale restructuring of airports across Canada, Transport Canada (formerly the Department of Transport), gave operational control of the airport to the Victoria Airport Authority.

In 2000, the Victoria Airport Authority began the process of renovating and expanding the terminal to meet passenger needs. In 2002, the new "airside hold room" and the new "arrivals rotunda" were rebuilt. By 2005, the new "departures area" was completed.

In May 2005, the federal government, which owns the land, announced a reduction in the rent paid by the Victoria Airport Authority. This will save $0.6 million Canadian each year and $12 million CAD over the life of the lease, which is 50 years.

In July 2016, Westjet Airlines announced that they would be permanently ending service to Honolulu from Victoria. The non-stop route had started in 2009 and had ended due to the lack of demand.

In September 2018, United Airlines announced that the daily United Express flight from Victoria to San Francisco would permanently end on January 7, 2019, concluding over a decade of daily non-stop service between the two cities.

In March 2019, Delta Air Lines announced that all Delta flights from Victoria to Seattle would permanently end on September 2, 2019, concluding a three-year presence by the airline in Victoria and leaving Alaska Airlines as the only airline serving Victoria directly from Seattle or anywhere in the United States. Delta was the second airline to leave Victoria that year, after United Airlines withdrew service in January 2019.

Terminal

The main terminal has ten gates, organized as gates 3–4, 5–11, and 12–13. Gates 3-4 and 12-13 are equipped with aircraft loading bridges.

There are three luggage carousels: two located at the arrivals area for domestic passengers, and one for international flights located inside the customs area.

As of December 1, 2010, time limited, ad supported Wi-Fi internet service provided by Telus is available terminal wide.

Airlines and destinations

Nearly all commercial flights at Victoria fly either to Canadian domestic airports or to Seattle. Seasonal scheduled flights by Air Transat, Sunwing Airlines, and WestJet also connect Victoria to tourist destinations in Mexico. For the Summer 2017 season, Air Canada Rouge operated wide-body Boeing 767s on its daily flights to Toronto

Passenger

Cargo

Statistics

Annual traffic

Development plans
Victoria Airport Authority's 2008 master plan laid out a timeline of proposed changes to the airport.

Year 1–5

 Full parallel taxiway east to runway 09/27 (completed)
 New taxiway exit from runway 09 to taxiway S
 New maintenance facility and fire hall on the west side of the airport (completed)
 First phase of apron IV expansion to accommodate interim demand (completed)
 Extend approach lighting on runway 27 by 
 Additional terminal building public parking (completed)
 Construct a bicycle/walking path around the perimeter of the airport property (completed)
 Add two new passenger loading bridges (completed)
 New military hangar to store new Royal Canadian Air Force (RCAF) Sikorsky CH-148 Cyclone helicopters (completed)

Year 6–10
 Upgrading of approach lighting on runway 09 (in progress)
 Decommission taxiway D
 Apron IV expansion to the north
 New taxiway from apron IV to runway 03/21
 Construct a new general aviation taxiway
 Construct road access from Mills Road
 Realign Willingdon Road to accommodate additional terminal building parking
 First phase of terminal expansion (upper level hold room and two additional loading bridges)

Year 11–20
 New Canada Border Services Agency immigration and customs facility and US border preclearance area
 North concourse terminal expansion
 Construct a car parking structure
 A  runway expansion of 09/27

Flight training
There are several organisations that offer flight training at the airport:

 Ocean Air Floatplanes (charter service, tours, float plane training using Cessna 180H)
 Victoria Flying Club (small prop aircraft training, charter service, float plane, Multi-engine IFR Training, Red Bird Simulator)
 Royal Canadian Air Cadets

Transportation to the airport

Victoria International Airport is 22 km from downtown Victoria.

It is served by taxi (Yellow Cab).

BC Transit routes 87 and 88 make connections to the airport. Passengers using BC Transit can connect with intercity (IslandLink Bus, or Tofino Bus Services) and regional coach service (Pacific Coach Lines) in Victoria.

By car, the airport is normally a 20-minute drive from downtown Victoria (with little or no traffic, and a 40-minute drive with traffic) via Highway 17.
The airport has short term and long term/daily parking lots next to the terminal with an additional overflow lot. Rental lot is located to the southwest of the terminal building.

A new interchange at Highway 17 and McTavish Road, the main highway access point to the airport, was completed in April 2011. Funding for the interchange was shared between the federal, provincial governments and Victoria Airport Authority.

Fire and rescue

Victoria International Airport Fire and Rescue operates three crash tenders and one support vehicle to deal with emergencies at the airport. The current station (Airport Fire Service and Airport Operations) opened in 2010 to replace the former station dating back to World War II.

Fixed-base operations
 Shell Aerocentre
 Vancouver Island Helicopters (VIH)
 Viking Air

See also
 British Columbia Aviation Museum
 List of airports in Greater Victoria
 Victoria Airport Water Aerodrome, adjacent to Victoria International Airport, seaplanes only
 Victoria Harbour (Camel Point) Heliport, helicopters only, adjacent to cruise ship terminal near downtown Victoria
 Victoria Inner Harbour Airport, downtown Victoria, seaplanes only

References

External links

 Victoria International Airport (official site)
 Victoria International Airport  on COPA's Places to Fly airport directory

Onsite operators
 Victoria (CYYJ) Shell Aerocentre private aircraft, private jet charters.
 VIH Aviation Group, helicopter services, private jet charters.
 Viking Air De Havilland, firefighting, aerial surveillance.

National Airports System
Certified airports in British Columbia
Saanich Peninsula
Transport in the Capital Regional District
Airports established in 1914
1914 establishments in British Columbia